Emanuel J. Brooks (born November 27, 1985) is an American mixed martial artist currently competing in the Middleweight division. A professional since 2010, he has fought in Bellator MMA.

Background
Brooks competed in wrestling at Cahokia High School, and later at the University of Missouri.

Mixed martial arts career

Bellator MMA
Brooks made his Bellator debut on October 8, 2011 at Bellator 53. He faced Greg Scott and won via second-round TKO.

He then quickly returned against Willian de Souza at Bellator 56 on October 29, 2011. He won the fight via unanimous decision.

Brooks faced Mikhail Malyutin at Bellator 65 on April 13, 2012. He won via unanimous decision.

Brooks faced Kalvin Hackney at Bellator 69 on May 18, 2012. He won the fight via unanimous decision.

Brooks was expected to face Joey Holt on June 22, 2012 at Bellator 71. However, the bout was cancelled for unknown reasons.

Brooks faced Darrell Horcher on October 19, 2012 at Bellator 77. Brooks lost the fight via KO in the first round.

Post-Bellator
Brooks was scheduled to face Billy Evangelista at MMA Xtreme on August 24, 2013. The bout was cancelled for unknown reasons. Brooks was expected to face Yosdenis Cedeno at CFA 12 on October 12, 2013. However, this bout was also cancelled for unknown reasons.

Over a year away from competition, Brooks returned and faced Johnny Case at RFA 10: Rhodes vs. Jouban on October 25, 2013. He lost the fight via split decision.

Brooks was expected to face Zach Juusola on March 7, 2014 at RFA 13. The bout was cancelled for unknown reasons.

Brooks faced Alex Ricci on May 30, 2014 at Substance Cage Combat 2.0. He lost the fight via unanimous decision.

Brooks was expected to face Efrain Escudero at Titan FC 29 on August 22, 2014. The bout was cancelled when Escudero re-signed with the UFC.

Brooks faced Todd Moore on September 26, 2014 at Titan FC 30. He won the fight via unanimous decision.

In June 2015, Brooks lost to Brazilian fighter Ricardo Tirloni in the main event of Arena Tour 6.

Brooks faced Jason Novelli at Titan FC 35: Healy vs. Hawn on September 19, 2015. He lost the fight via unanimous decision.

Brooks faced Ben Egli at Titan FC 37: Simon vs. Dos Santos on March 4, 2016. He won the fight via unanimous decision.

Brooks faced Dakota Cochrane at VFC 56 on April 14, 2017. He won the fight via unanimous decision.

Return to Bellator and other promotions
Brooks returned to Bellator and faced Guilherme Vasconcelos at Bellator 181 on July 14, 2017. He won the fight via unanimous decision.

Brooks won by decision against Husein Kushagov at Absolute Championship Akhmat on April 21, 2018, in Rimini, Italy. 

Brooks won against Steve Kennedy at Absolute Championship Akhmat on June 16, 2018, in Brisbane, Australia. 

Brooks lost due to an arm injury against Logan Storley at Bellator 233 on Nov. 9, 2019. The fight was stopped after the first round. 

Brooks defeated Derek Holly at Fighting Alliance Championship 5, in Kansas City by submission due to Brabo choke at 4:58 in the 3rd round.

Mixed martial arts record

|-
|Win
|align=center|14–6
|Derek Holly
|Submission (brabo choke)
|FAC 5
|
|align=center|3
|align=center|4:58
|Independence, Missouri, United States
|
|-
|Loss
|align=center|13–6
|Logan Storley
|TKO (doctor stoppage)
|Bellator 233
|
|align=center|1
|align=center|5:00
|Thackerville, Oklahoma, United States
|Catchweight (175 lb) bout.
|-
|Win
|align=center|13–5
|Steve Kennedy
|Decision (unanimous)
|ACB 88: Barnatt vs. Celiński
|
|align=center|3
|align=center|5:00
|Brisbane, Australia
|Middleweight debut.
|-
|Win
|align=center|12–5
|Husein Kushagov
|Decision (split)
|ACB 85: Leone vs Ginazov
|
|align=center|3
|align=center|5:00
|Rimini, Italy
|
|-
|Win
|align=center|11–5
|Guilherme Vasconcelos
|Decision (unanimous)
|Bellator 181
|
|align=center|3
|align=center|5:00
|Thackerville, Oklahoma, United States
|
|-
|Win
|align=center|10–5
|Dakota Cochrane
|Decision (unanimous)
|VFC 56
|
|align=center|3
|align=center|5:00
|Omaha, Nebraska, United States
|
|-
|Win
|align=center|9–5
|Ben Egli
|Decision (unanimous)
|Titan FC 37: Simon vs. Dos Santos
|
|align=center|3
|align=center|5:00
|Ridgefield, Washington, United States
|Welterweight debut.
|-
|Loss
|align=center|8–5
|Jason Novelli
|Decision (unanimous)
|Titan FC 35: Healy vs. Hawn
|
|align=center|3
|align=center|5:00
|Ridgefield, Washington, United States
|
|-
|Loss
|align=center|8–4
|Ricardo Tirloni
|Decision (unanimous)
|Arena Tour 6: Tirloni vs. Brooks
|
|align=center| 3
|align=center| 5:00
|Cordoba, Argentina
|
|-
|Win
|align=center|8–3
|Todd Moore
|Decision (unanimous)
|Titan FC 30: Brilz vs. Magalhaes
|
|align=center|3
|align=center|5:00
|Cedar Park, Texas, United States
|Catchweight (165 lb) bout.
|-
|Loss
|align=center|7–3
|Alex Ricci
|Decision (unanimous)
|Substance Cage Combat 2.0
|
|align=center|3
|align=center|5:00
|Toronto, Ontario, Canada
|
|-
|Loss
|align=center|7–2
|Johnny Case
|Decision (split)
|RFA 10: Rhodes vs. Jouban
|
|align=center|3
|align=center|5:00
|Des Moines, Iowa, United States
|
|-
|Loss
|align=center|7–1
|Darrell Horcher
|KO (punch)
|Bellator 77
|
|align=center|1
|align=center|0:21
|Reading, Pennsylvania, United States
|
|-
|Win
|align=center|7–0
|Kalvin Hackney
|Decision (unanimous)
|Bellator 69
|
|align=center|3
|align=center|5:00
|Lake Charles, Louisiana, United States
|
|-
|Win
|align=center|6–0
|Mikhail Malyutin
|Decision (unanimous)
|Bellator 65
|
|align=center|3
|align=center|5:00
|Atlantic City, New Jersey, United States
|
|-
|Win
|align=center|5–0
|Willian de Souza
|Decision (unanimous)
|Bellator 56
|
|align=center|3
|align=center|5:00
|Kansas City, Kansas, United States
|
|-
|Win
|align=center|4–0
|Greg Scott
|TKO (punches)
|Bellator 53
|
|align=center|2
|align=center|2:40
|Miami, Oklahoma, United States
|
|-
|Win
|align=center|3–0
|Matt Rider
|Submission (arm-triangle choke)
|Fight Me MMA: Trujillo vs. Gwaltney
|
|align=center|2
|align=center|2:58
|St. Charles, Missouri, United States
|
|-
|Win
|align=center|2–0
|Evian Rodriguez
|Submission (arm-triangle choke)
|WC: Wright Fights 2
|
|align=center|1
|align=center|3:36
|St. Charles, Missouri, United States
|
|-
|Win
|align=center|1–0
|Eric Kriegermeier
|Decision (split)
|SportFight X 3: Undefeated
|
|align=center|3
|align=center|5:00
|Atlanta, Georgia, United States
|

References

Living people
1985 births
American male mixed martial artists
Lightweight mixed martial artists
People from Cahokia, Illinois